The Distinguished Service Star  is the third highest military award of the Armed Forces of the Philippines. It is awarded for eminently meritorious and valuable service rendered while holding a position of great responsibility.

Description of the award
The medal is worn around the neck, suspended from a ribbon of dark blue, with a red vertical stripe in the center.  The medal, as the name would indicate, is in the form of a five pointed star.  The star contains a central disc displaying the Coat of arms of the Philippines.  Surmounting the seal in an arc is a golden scroll engraved worth "Merit".  The star is attached to its ribbon by a wreath of twenty-six dark green leaves and ten white buds. On the reverse of the medal is engraved "For Distinguished Service."

References

Citations

Bibliography
 The AFP Adjutant General, AFP Awards and Decorations Handbook, 1995, 1997, OTAG.

 
Military awards and decorations of the Philippines